The 2010 Liga de Fútbol Profesional Boliviano season is the 34th season of Bolivia's top-flight professional football league. The season is split into two championships—the Apertura and the Clausura—and the Torneo de Invierno

Format
The 2009 season will be divided into two championships and a cup, each with their own format.

Campeonato Apertura

The Apertura championship will be divided into two phases. The first phase will have the twelve teams divided into two groups. The teams will play within each group, in addition to a cross-group rivalry (for example: Oriente  vs. Blooming). The best-three teams in each group will advance to the Winner's Hexagonal, while the rest of the teams will play the Loser's Hexagonal. In each hexagonal, each team will play within each group. The winner of the Winner's Hexagonal will be declared the champion and will qualify to 2011 Copa Libertadores with the Bolivia 2 berth. The runner-up will qualify to the 2011 Copa Sudamericana with the Bolivia 1 berth and the winner of the Loser's Hexagonal will qualify to 2010 Copa Sudamericana with the Bolivia 3 berth.

Torneo de Invierno

The Torneo de Invierno will be what was traditionally known as the Play-Off. The first stage will have the twelve teams play against a local rival over two legs. The winners of each tie and the two best losers will advance to the quarterfinals. The cup will continue on a single-elimination basis with two legs per stage. The winner will qualify to the 2011 Copa Sudamericana as the Bolivia 3 berth.

Campeonato Clausura

The Clausura championship will be a double round-robin league format. The team with the most points after the twenty-two rounds will be declared the champion and will qualify to the 2011 Copa Libertadores as the Bolivia 1 berth. The runner-up will qualify to the 2011 Copa Libertadores as the Bolivia 3 berth and the third placed-team will qualify to the 2011 Copa Sudamericana with the Bolivia 2 berth.

Relegation

Relegation will be determined after the Clausura. The team with the worst two-year average will be relegated to the Regional Leagues, while the next-worst team will contest a playoff against the runner-up of the 2010 Copa Simón Bolívar.

Teams
The number of teams for 2010 remains the same. Nacional Potosí finished last in the 2009 relegation table and was relegated to the  Bolivian Football Regional Leagues. They were replaced by the 2009 Copa Simón Bolívar champion Guabirá, who last played in the LFPB in 2008.

Campeonato Apertura
The Campeonato Apertura (officially the Campeonato Apertura Entel for sponsorship reasons) is the first championship of this season. The championship began on February 20 and ended June 9, two days before the start of the 2010 FIFA World Cup at South Africa.

First phase

Serie A
Standings

Results

Serie B
Standings

Results

Inter-series results

{| class="wikitable"
|-
!width=250| Home Team
!width=50| Results
!width=250| Away Team
|-
!colspan=3| —
|-

|-

|-
!colspan=3| —
|-

|-

|-
!colspan=3| —
|-

|-

|-
!colspan=3| —
|-

|-

|-
!colspan=3| —
|-

|-

|-
!colspan=3| —
|-

|-

Second phase
The Second Phase began on May 8.

Winner's Hexagonal

Standings

Results

Loser's Hexagonal

Standings

Results

Top goalscorers

Torneo de Invierno
The Torneo de Invierno (officially the Torneo de Invierno Entel for sponsorship reasons) will be played in the middle of this season, concurrent to the 2010 FIFA World Cup. The winner will earn the Bolivia 3 berth for the 2010 Copa Sudamericana.

First stage
The first phase will be contested over a series of six regional derbies (rivalries). The winners of each tie will be determined in a manner similar to the Copa Libertadores: 1st points, 2nd goal difference; 3rd away goals, 4th penalty shoot-out. The six winners (in bold) and the two best losers (in italics) will advance to the second phase. Team #1 played the first leg at home.

Second stage
For the second stage, if a tie in points exists after the end of the second leg, the match will go directly into a penalty shootout as per the Laws of the Game.

Semifinals

Finals

As Oriente Petrolero later qualified for the 2011 Copa Libertadores through the Clausura, San José qualified for the 2011 Copa Sudamericana First Stage.

Campeonato Clausura
The Campeonato Clausura (officially the Campeonato Clausura Entel for sponsorship reasons) will be the second championship of this season.

Standings

Results

Top goalscorers

Relegation

Source:

Relegation/promotion playoff

References

External links
Official website of the LFPB 
Official season regulations 

Bolivian Primera División seasons
1